Yazykovo is a rural locality (a selo) in Andreyevskoye Rural Settlement, Sudogodsky District, Vladimir Oblast, Russia. The population was 48 as of 2010.

Geography 
Yazykovo is located 28 km east of Sudogda (the district's administrative centre) by road. Bolotsky is the nearest rural locality.

References 

Rural localities in Sudogodsky District